A special election was held in  on August 30, 1802, to fill a vacancy left by the resignation of Joseph Peirce (F) earlier that year.

Election results

Hunt took office on December 6, 1802

See also
List of special elections to the United States House of Representatives

References

New Hampshire At-large
New Hampshire 1802 At-large
1802 At-large
New Hampshire At-large
United States House of Representatives At-large
United States House of Representatives 1802 at-large